Mahyeldi Ansharullah (born 25 December 1966) is an Indonesian politician from the Prosperous Justice Party who is the current governor of West Sumatra. He was made mayor of Padang in 2014, following a five-year tenure as deputy and victory in the elections of 2013 and 2018.

Active in Islamic dawah since his years in Andalas University, he became a member of the Islamist Prosperous Justice Party and first became an elected official in 2004 when he was elected to the province council. His programs as mayor of Padang has included the improvement of the city's infrastructure and hygiene, in addition to education with an added emphasis on studies of the Quran.

In March 2020, Mahyeldi said he will waive his six months' salary amid the COVID-19 pandemic.

Personal life
Born in the city of Bukittinggi as the first son of seven siblings, his father was a becak driver. He began showing interest in dawah in his teen years, when he was studying in a local junior high school. After completing his 12th year of study in Bukittinggi, he continued his education in Andalas University at Padang, the provincial capital.

Career
Mahyeldi began his political activity following the fall of Suharto, joining the newly formed Prosperous Justice Party where he became the provincial chairman between 2002-2005. He took part in the 2004 elections and won a seat in the provincial council as deputy speaker. He then resigned to run in the 2008 local elections as deputy mayor with Fauzi Bahar as his running mate. Following their victory, he was made deputy mayor on 18 February the following year.

In the next election on 2013, he ran with Emzalmi against 9 other candidates for mayorship. After securing just 29.45% of the votes in the first round, he won 50.29% of the votes in the runoffs. Despite an initial challenge to the Constitutional Court, he was officially made mayor on 13 May 2014.

As mayor
He established pesantren in the ramadhan in public schools on 2015 where it had formerly been held in mosques, and offered scholarships to students who had memorized sufficient Juz' of the Quran. In 2018, he led a march attended by thousands which denounced LGBT individuals. During the rally, Mahyeldi declared his opposition to LGBT rights, stating that "To the perpetrators of sin, let them repent and those who protect them immediately be aware because they will face opposition from all parties and communities in Padang as well as security forces.”

As governor
Mahyeldi was elected as governor in the 2020 West Sumatra gubernatorial election, winning 32.43 percent of votes. He was sworn in as governor on 25 February 2021.

Footnotes

References 

Living people
1966 births
Padang
Prosperous Justice Party politicians
Mayors of Padang
Minangkabau people
Andalas University alumni
Members of Indonesian provincial assemblies
Mayors of places in Indonesia
Governors of West Sumatra